The 1944 Indiana Hoosiers football team represented the Indiana Hoosiers in the 1944 Big Ten Conference football season. The Hoosiers played their home games at Memorial Stadium in Bloomington, Indiana. The team was coached by Bo McMillin, in his 11th year as head coach of the Hoosiers.

Schedule

1945 NFL draftees

References

Indiana
Indiana Hoosiers football seasons
Indiana Hoosiers football